

Armenian Sunday schools
K Tahta Armenian community Sunday school of London (London, UK)
Veratsnund Armenian Sunday School of Moscow (Moscow, Russia)
Mesrob Mashtots Sunday School of Perm (Perm, Russia)
Armat School of Krasnodar (Krasnodar, Russia)

Armenian K-12 schools
AGBU Manoogian-Demirdjian School (Granada Hills, CA)
Armenian Mesrobian School (Pico Rivera, CA)
Rose and Alex Pilibos Armenian School (Los Angeles, CA)
Holy Martyrs Armenian Elementary and Ferrahian High School (North Hills, Los Angeles, CA)
TCA Arshag Dickranian Armenian School (Hollywood, Los Angeles, CA) (closed)

Armenian K-8 schools
Armenian Sisters Academy (Montrose, CA)
Armenian Sisters Academy (Radnor, PA)
Krouzian-Zekarian-Vasbouragan Armenian School (San Francisco, CA)
Chamlian Armenian School (Glendale, CA)
Hovnanian School (New Milford, NJ)

Armenian high schools
Melkonian Educational Institute (Cyprus)
Armenian Public High School Number 104 (located on the former property of Vank Monastery, Tiflis) (Tbilisi, Georgia)

Armenian colleges and universities

The Armenian Virtual College is a new learning institutes of the Armenian General Benevolent Union (AGBU). It gives some certificate programs and credit-bearing courses in Armenian education at the college level. The AVC has three departments: Language, History, and Culture. The programme is available in 5 languages: Armenian (Eastern & Western), English, Russian, French and Spanish.

 (Website)
Haigazian University (Beirut, Lebanon)
St. Nersess Armenian Seminary (Armonk, NY USA)

Armenian Studies Programs at Other Institutions
University of Southern California
University of California, Los Angeles
University of California, Berkeley
University of California, Irvine
California State University, Northridge
Glendale Community College
Harvard University
University of Michigan
Oxford University
University of São Paulo
Rutgers University
University of Chicago

Minority schools